The Yuba City bus disaster occurred on May 21, 1976 in Martinez, California.  A chartered school bus transporting 52 passengers on an elevated offramp left the roadway, landing on its roof.  Of the 52 passengers (not including the driver), 28 students and an adult adviser were killed in the crash.

As of 2019, the incident remains the second-worst bus disaster in United States history and the deadliest to involve a school bus (in any usage).  It also remains the deadliest highway disaster ever investigated by the National Transportation Safety Board (NTSB) since its creation.

Incident 

On May 21, 1976, Yuba City High School chartered a school bus from Student Transportation Lines, Inc. to transport its a cappella choir from Yuba City, California to Miramonte High School in Orinda for a friendship day involving the choirs of the two schools.  The company supplied a Crown bus, dating from 1950.

The accident occurred at 10:55 a.m., as the driver, Evan Prothero, 49, of Olivehurst, took the Marina Vista Avenue off-ramp (exit 56) from I-680 southbound from the Benicia–Martinez Bridge. Prothero was unfamiliar with this bus, and mistook the low air pressure warning (for the air brakes) for a warning of low engine oil pressure.  Intending to stop for oil, the driver exited the freeway at the aforementioned off ramp; the air brake system failed due to lack of air pressure.  With no braking capability, the bus struck the mounted bridge rail and left the elevated roadway.  After falling , the bus landed on its roof, crushing it to the base of the window line.

Victims 
Out of 52 passengers on board, twenty-eight students and an adult adviser were killed. All of the surviving passengers were injured, most critically. The driver survived the crash but was seriously hurt. 

 Larry R. Shearer, 14
 Carrie Emmirch, 15
 Danielle Cote, 15
 Joanne A. Matson, 15
 Marla Azim, 15
 Bobby R. Ortega, 16
 Catherine R. Mudge, 16
 Kris Huston, 16 
 Larry H. Rooney, 16
 Rachel Carlson, 16
 Ruth A. Bowen, 16
 Carlene Engle 17 
 Constance Adkins, 17 
 Cynthia Graham, 17
 Jim Frantz, 17 
 Seth Rosebrough, 17 
 Sharlene Engle, 17
 Steven Gust, 17 
 Robert Randolph, 17
 Robert J. Stafford, 17
 Amy Hicks, 18
 Bonnie Barfield, 18
 Jodie L. McCoy, 18
 Lori Killingsworth, 18
 Marti A. Melani, 18
 Pamela S. Engstrom, 18
 Tom Brooks, 18
 Christina E. Cadena Estabrook, 25, wife of Dean Estabrook, who was driving his own vehicle in front of the bus when the disaster occurred. 

The crash claimed one additional victim. Daniel I. Wright, 15, died on May 24, 1976 at the Highland Hospital in Oakland, California due to the injuries he sustained in the crash.

Investigation 

The accident was investigated by the National Transportation Safety Board, which it attributed to the unfamiliarity and inexperience of the driver with the design of the 26-year-old bus and his confusion of oil pressure and air pressure warnings.  Contributing to the accident were: 
 The failure of the air compressor drivebelt
 The failure of the maintenance program and pre-trip inspection to detect and replace the deteriorated air compressor drivebelt
 The failure of the signing system to adequately alert the driver to the critical geometrics of the ramp
 The severe radius of the curvature of the ramp
 The design of the curb as part of the ramp railing
 A bridge rail system that did not redirect the bus.

The upside of the accident is that the training and testing for school bus drivers has been improved, plus the design and construction of school buses has been improved. Additionally pre-trip and post-trip inspections and repairs are now more refined and more regulated.

Memorials
The Yuba City bus disaster was the second-worst bus disaster in U.S. history, exceeded only by the 1963 train-bus collision in Chualar, California which claimed the lives of 32 Mexican farmworkers.

In May 1996, on the twentieth anniversary of the accident, a memorial built near the water at the Martinez Marina was dedicated to the victims. Bearing the names of those who died, it was constructed by firefighters who had responded to the accident and their friends and largely funded by them and donations they obtained.  On the 35th anniversary of the accident in May 2011, Contra Costa County firefighters dedicated a monument in Yuba City.

In 2015, the I-680 freeway off-ramp was replaced with one having a longer and flatter approach.

References

Transportation disasters in California
Bus incidents in the United States
History of Contra Costa County, California
1976 road incidents
1976 in California
May 1976 events in the United States